.sy is the Internet country code top-level domain (ccTLD) for Syria. The registry is operated by the National Agency for Network Services. It took over from the Syrian Telecommunications Establishment in 2011.

Second-level domains 
There are several reserved second-level domains. They are:
.edu.sy (educational institutions)
.gov.sy (Government of Syria and government agencies)
.net.sy (network operator/providers)
.mil.sy (Syrian Armed Forces)
.com.sy (commercial entities)
.org.sy (nonprofit organisations)
.news.sy (news agencies)

External links 
 IANA .sy whois information
 .sy registration rules

Country code top-level domains
Telecommunications in Syria
Internet in Syria

sv:Toppdomän#S